Antimimistis attenuata is a moth in the family Geometridae. It is found in Sri Lanka, north-eastern Himalaya, Borneo, Sulawesi, Seram and New Guinea. Records from Queensland refer to Antimimistis illaudata which is sometimes listed as a synonym of Antimimistis attenuata.

The wings are dark blackish brown, with a some finely paler fasciae.

References

Moths described in 1887
Eupitheciini
Moths of Asia
Moths of Oceania